Asker Aliens B.C. is a professional basketball club from Asker, Norway. The club plays in the BLNO, the top tier basketball league in Norway.

Honours
BLNO
Winners (5): 2002–03, 2004–05, 2007–08, 2009–10, 2014–15

Notable players

References

External links
 Eurobasket.com Asker Aliens BC Page

Basketball teams established in 1974
Basketball teams in Norway
Sport in Asker
1974 establishments in Norway